A parametric process is an optical process in which light interacts with matter in such a way as to leave the quantum state of the material unchanged.  As a direct consequence of this there can be no net transfer of energy, momentum, or angular momentum between the optical field and the physical system.  In contrast a non-parametric process is a process in which any part of the quantum state of the system changes.

Temporal characteristics
Because a parametric process prohibits a net change in the energy state of the system, parametric processes are "instantaneous".  For example, if an atom absorbs a photon with energy E, the atom's energy increases by ΔE = E, but as a parametric process, the quantum state cannot change and thus the elevated energy state must be a temporary virtual state.  By the Heisenberg Uncertainty Principle we know that ΔEΔt~ħ/2, thus the lifetime of a parametric process is roughly Δt~ħ/2ΔE, which is appreciably small for any non-zero ΔE.

Parametric versus non-parametric processes

Linear optics
In a linear optical system the dielectric polarization, P, responds linearly to the presence of an electric field, E, and thus we can write

where ε0 is the electric constant, χ is the (complex) electric susceptibility, and nr(ni) is the real(imaginary) component of the refractive index of the medium.  The effects of a parametric process will affect only nr, whereas a nonzero value of ni can only be caused by a non-parametric process.

Thus in linear optics a parametric process will act as a lossless dielectric with the following effects:
 Refraction
 Diffraction
 Elastic scattering
 Rayleigh scattering
 Mie scattering

Alternatively, non-parametric processes often involve loss (or gain) and give rise to:
 Absorption
 Inelastic scattering
 Raman scattering
 Brillouin scattering
 Various optical emission processes
 Photoluminescence
 Fluorescence
 Luminescence
 Phosphorescence

Nonlinear optics

In a nonlinear media, the dielectric polarization P responds nonlinearly to the electric field E of the light.  As a parametric process is in general coherent, many parametric nonlinear processes will depend on phase matching and will usually be polarization dependent.

Sample parametric nonlinear processes:
 Second-harmonic generation (SHG), or frequency doubling, generation of light with a doubled frequency (half the wavelength)
 Third-harmonic generation (THG), generation of light with a tripled frequency (one-third the wavelength) (usually done in two steps: SHG followed by SFG of original and frequency-doubled waves)
 High harmonic generation (HHG), generation of light with frequencies much greater than the original (typically 100 to 1000 times greater)
 Sum-frequency generation (SFG), generation of light with a frequency that is the sum of two other frequencies (SHG is a special case of this)
 Difference frequency generation (DFG), generation of light with a frequency that is the difference between two other frequencies
 Optical parametric amplification (OPA), amplification of a signal input in the presence of a higher-frequency pump wave, at the same time generating an idler wave (can be considered as DFG)
 Optical parametric oscillation (OPO), generation of a signal and idler wave using a parametric amplifier in a resonator (with no signal input)
 Optical parametric generation (OPG), like parametric oscillation but without a resonator, using a very high gain instead
 Spontaneous parametric down-conversion (SPDC), the amplification of the vacuum fluctuations in the low gain regime
 Optical Kerr effect, intensity dependent refractive index
 Self-focusing
 Kerr-lens modelocking (KLM)
 Self-phase modulation (SPM), a  effect
 Optical solitons
 Cross-phase modulation (XPM)
 Four-wave mixing (FWM), can also arise from other nonlinearities
 Cross-polarized wave generation (XPW), a  effect in which a wave with polarization vector perpendicular to the input is generated

Sample non-parametric nonlinear processes:
 Stimulated Raman scattering
 Raman amplification
 Two-photon absorption, simultaneous absorption of two photons, transferring the energy to a single electron
 Multiphoton absorption
 Multiple photoionisation, near-simultaneous removal of many bound electrons by one photon

See also
 Nonlinear optics

Notes

References
 
 

Nonlinear optics
Quantum optics